The Last Tycoon is an American television series, originating from a pilot produced in 2016 as part of Amazon Studios' seventh pilot season. The show stars Matt Bomer and Kelsey Grammer and is loosely based on F. Scott Fitzgerald's last book, the unfinished and posthumously published 1941 novel The Last Tycoon. Amazon picked up the pilot to series on July 27, 2016. The first season premiered on July 28, 2017. On September 9, 2017, Amazon cancelled the series.

Premise
Based on F. Scott Fitzgerald's last book The Last Tycoon (published posthumously), the show takes place in 1936 Hollywood. Monroe Stahr, loosely based on the producer Irving Thalberg, battles his boss Pat Brady.

Cast

Main
 Matt Bomer as Monroe Stahr 
 Kelsey Grammer as Pat Brady
 Lily Collins as Cecelia Brady
 Dominique McElligott as Kathleen Moore
 Enzo Cilenti as Aubrey Hackett
 Koen De Bouw as Tomas Szep
 Mark O'Brien as Max Miner
 Rosemarie DeWitt as Rose Brady

Recurring
 Bailey Noble as Bess Burrows
 Whitney Rice as Mary Greer
 Kerry O'Malley as Kay Maloney
 Saul Rubinek as Louis B. Mayer
 Iddo Goldberg as Fritz Lang
 Annika Marks as Bernadette Davis
 Jennifer Beals as Margo Taft
 Jessica De Gouw as Minna Davis

Guest stars
 Seth Fisher as Irving Thalberg ("More Stars Than There Are in Heaven")
 Larry Cedar as Dr. Harold Grife ("More Stars Than There Are in Heaven")
 Stefanie von Pfetten as Marlene Dietrich ("Burying the Boy Genius")
 Rob Brownstein as Jack Warner ("Eine Kleine Reichmusik")
 Nick Lehane as Frank Capra ("An Enemy Among Us")
 Joshua Weinstein as George Cukor ("An Enemy Among Us")

Episodes

References

External links
 

2017 American television series debuts
2017 American television series endings
2010s American drama television series
English-language television shows
Amazon Prime Video original programming
Television shows based on American novels
Television series about show business
Television series about filmmaking
Television series by Amazon Studios
Television series by Sony Pictures Television
Television series set in 1936